Eulima philippiana is a species of sea snail, a marine gastropod mollusk in the family Eulimidae. The species is one of a number within the genus Eulima. Apparently, this species resembles a member of the genus Hypermastus, but the generic allocation remains uncertain.

References

External links
 To World Register of Marine Species

philippiana
Gastropods described in 1860